Sir William Ashburnham, 2nd Baronet (1 April 1678 – 7 November 1755) was a British politician who sat in the House of Commons between 1710 and 1741.

Ashburnham was the eldest surviving son of Sir Denny Ashburnham, 1st Baronet of Broomham and his wife Anne Watkins, daughter of Sir David Watkins. In 1697, he succeeded his father in the baronetcy. He married Margaret Pelham, daughter of Sir Nicholas Pelham on 7 June 1701.

Ashburnham was appointed to a sinecure post as Chamberlain of the Exchequer in 1710 and held the post until his death. At the 1710 general election he was returned unopposed as Member of Parliament for Hastings on the family interest but did not stand in 1713. He was returned as MP for Seaford at the 1715 general election but resigned his seat in 1717 when he was granted another sinecure post as Commissioner of the Alienation Office. He returned to parliament as MP for Hastings at the 1722 general election and held the seat at the elections of 1727 and 1734.   In 1735 he was appointed receiver of fines. In 1741 he resigned his seat in parliament through ill health but retained his government posts until his death.

Ashburnham died on 7 November 1755 and was buried at Guestling in Sussex. His marriage was childless and he was succeeded in the baronetcy by his younger brother Charles.

References

1678 births
1755 deaths
Baronets in the Baronetage of England
British MPs 1710–1713
British MPs 1715–1722
British MPs 1722–1727
British MPs 1727–1734
British MPs 1734–1741
Members of the Parliament of Great Britain for English constituencies
People from Guestling